Scylla Gaffrée Nogueira Médici (4 October 1907 – 25 January 2003) was the First Lady of Brazil between 1969 and 1974 and the wife of Brazilian President Emílio Garrastazu Médici.

With her only husband, she had two sons: Sérgio and Roberto. As a Brazilian first lady, Scylla was discreet. Her husband died in 1985. Scylla Médici died of natural causes, in a public hospital, aged 95. She died in Rio de Janeiro on 25 January 2003.

References

1907 births
2003 deaths
First ladies of Brazil
People from Bagé